Koga Station is the name of two train stations in Japan:

 Koga Station (Ibaraki) (古河駅)
 Koga Station (Fukuoka) (古賀駅)

See also
 Hizen-Koga Station, on the Nagasaki Main Line in Nagasaki City